Tabidia aculealis is a moth in the family Crambidae. It was described by Francis Walker in 1866. It is found in Indonesia (Sula Islands, Java) and Sri Lanka.

The larvae feed on the leaves of sweet potato (Ipomoea batatas). They feed on the mesophyll from the inner side of the rolled leaf.

References

Moths described in 1866
Spilomelinae